Amddiffynydd yr Eglwys was a monthly Welsh language periodical published by J. Morris in Rhyl, Wales.

It began publication in 1873. It contained mainly anti-nonconformist religious articles, and a small number of other articles of general subject matter. The Reverend David Walter Thomas (Gwallter Geraint o Geredigion) (1829–1905), the Dean of Bangor, Henry Edwards (1837–1884), and Canon Daniel Evans (1832–1888) were the magazine's editors.

References 

Welsh-language magazines
Periodicals published in Wales
Publications established in 1873
1873 establishments in Wales
Christianity in Wales